"Hearts Still Beating" is the eighth episode and mid-season finale of the seventh season of the post-apocalyptic horror television series The Walking Dead, which aired on AMC on December 11, 2016. The episode was written by Matthew Negrate and Channing Powell, and directed by Michael E. Satrazemis.

The episode focuses on Negan's (Jeffrey Dean Morgan) unwelcome and unexpected visit to Alexandria as other members scavenge for supplies; with tensions high, things quickly spin out of control. It also features the final appearances of Olivia (Ann Mahoney) and Spencer Monroe (Austin Nichols). His death was adapted from Issue #111 of the comic book series.

Plot
At the Hilltop, Gregory warns Maggie not to let her growing popularity with the Hilltop residents go to her head. Maggie cannot locate Jesus and Sasha lies about his whereabouts, knowing he is looking for the Saviors' home, the Sanctuary.

At Alexandria, Negan tries to bond with Rick's son Carl while Rick and Aaron retrieve supplies from an abandoned houseboat floating in the middle of a walker-infested river, as part of their offering to the Saviors. Among the supplies are numerous guns, but no ammo, along with a vulgar note left by the previous owner sardonically congratulating them on their prize. They return to Alexandria, unaware they were watched by a man with mismatched boots. The Saviors check over the supplies and discover the vulgar note, believing it was written by Rick and Aaron for them. Aaron attempts to apologize, but the Saviors beat him up and Rick is unable to intervene.

At the Kingdom, Richard, a member of their military, pays Carol a visit inside her cottage, though Morgan is also there. Richard tries to persuade them both to have King Ezekiel consider fighting the Saviors, as he fears they may in fact kill them even if they continue to obey their demands. They debate and both staunchly refuse; Richard dejectedly leaves.

At the Sanctuary, with help from an anonymous source, Daryl is able to sneak out of his cell to a waiting motorcycle to escape. He encounters Fat Joey and bludgeons him to death with a pipe. Jesus finds Daryl and, together, they leave the compound, with Daryl recovering Rick's signature .357 Colt Python revolver from Joey's corpse. Nearby, Michonne has abducted a Savior woman and demands she show her the Sanctuary. The woman directs her to a nearby hill where Michonne sees that there are vast numbers of Saviors, more than they initially thought. The woman states it would be pointless to fight them and it would be better to just take the car and dump it, then adds that there is a silencer in the glove compartment. After a moment, Michonne kills her, dumps the body, and drives back to Alexandria.

Spencer, who has a vendetta against Rick, approaches Negan and proposes to talk. A pool table is set up outside and a crowd gathers, and as Negan plays, Spencer explains that Negan should name him as leader of Alexandria over Rick, since he will readily acquiesce to Negan's demands. Negan considers this, approaches Spencer and explains that unlike Rick, he has no guts and proceeds to disembowel him. Enraged, Rosita fires the single bullet that Eugene had made at Negan, but it strikes "Lucille", his bat. Savior Arat subdues Rosita while Negan demands to know who made the bullet. When Rosita lies and claims she did, Negan tells Arat to kill someone. Arat chooses and kills Olivia. By then, the gunfire has drawn Rick to the scene and he tries to confront Negan. Negan reminds him of his deal that no Alexandrian can have a firearm and Olivia's death was the penalty for disobedience. Eugene admits he made the bullet. Negan and the Saviors take their leave, taking Eugene with them. That night, Michonne convinces Rick that they must fight back against the Saviors and Rick finally accepts.

The next day, Rick, Michonne, Carl, Rosita, and Tara show up at the Hilltop, reuniting with Maggie, Sasha, and Enid. As they plan, Daryl and Jesus return to everyone's surprise. Rick and Daryl embrace, and Daryl returns his gun. The group makes plans to go to war with the Saviors.

At Alexandria that night, Father Gabriel keeps watch, unaware that the same figure with mismatched boots watches him from afar.

Reception

Critical reception

"Hearts Still Beating" received generally positive reviews from critics. On Rotten Tomatoes, it holds a 78% with an average rating of 7.44 out of 10, based on 32 reviews. The site's consensus reads: "Hearts Still Beating" corrects course after a frustrating first half to The Walking Deads seventh season, using an improved pace and some welcome narrative jolts to set up a hopeful, rousing conclusion.

Ratings
The episode received a 5.1 rating in the key 18-49 demographic with 10.58 million total viewers.

References

External links

"Hearts Still Beating" at AMC

2016 American television episodes
The Walking Dead (season 7) episodes